Michael Robert Cunningham is an American social psychologist and professor in the Department of Communications at the University of Louisville. He is known for his research on perceived physical attractiveness of both men and women by members of the opposite sex. He has also researched the effects of emotions like trust and guilt on financial decision-making. He is also known for his pioneering work on hand transplantation.

References

External links
Faculty page

American social psychologists
University of Louisville faculty
Living people
Carleton College alumni
University of Minnesota alumni
Year of birth missing (living people)